Statistics of Allsvenskan in season 1935/1936.

Overview
The league was contested by 12 teams, with IF Elfsborg winning the championship.

League table

Results

Footnotes

References 

Allsvenskan seasons
1935–36 in Swedish association football leagues
Sweden